Lithium hydride is an inorganic compound with the formula LiH. This alkali metal hydride is a colorless solid, although commercial samples are grey. Characteristic of a salt-like (ionic) hydride, it has a high melting point, and it is not soluble but reactive with all protic organic solvents. It is soluble and nonreactive with certain molten salts such as lithium fluoride, lithium borohydride, and sodium hydride. With a molar mass of 7.95 g/mol, it is the lightest ionic compound.

Physical properties
The dielectric constant of LiH decreases from 13.0 (static, low frequencies) to 3.6 (visible-light frequencies). LiH is a soft material with a Mohs hardness of 3.5. Its compressive creep (per 100 hours) rapidly increases from < 1% at 350 °C to > 100% at 475 °C, meaning that LiH can't provide mechanical support when heated.

The thermal conductivity of LiH decreases with temperature and depends on morphology: the corresponding values are 0.125 W/(cm·K) for crystals and 0.0695 W/(cm·K) for compacts at 50 °C, and 0.036 W/(cm·K) for crystals and 0.0432 W/(cm·K) for compacts at 500 °C. The linear thermal expansion coefficient is 4.2/°C at room temperature.

Synthesis and processing
LiH is produced by treating lithium metal with hydrogen gas:

This reaction is especially rapid at temperatures above 600 °C. Addition of 0.001–0.003% carbon, and/or increasing temperature and/or pressure, increases the yield up to 98% at 2-hour residence time. However, the reaction proceeds at temperatures as low as 29 °C. The yield is 60% at 99 °C and 85% at 125 °C, and the rate depends significantly on the surface condition of LiH.

Less common ways of LiH synthesis include thermal decomposition of lithium aluminium hydride (200 °C), lithium borohydride (300 °C), n-butyllithium (150 °C), or ethyllithium (120 °C), as well as several reactions involving lithium compounds of low stability and available hydrogen content.

Chemical reactions yield LiH in the form of lumped powder, which can be compressed into pellets without a binder. More complex shapes can be produced by casting from the melt. Large single crystals (about 80 mm long and 16 mm in diameter) can be then grown from molten LiH powder in hydrogen atmosphere by the Bridgman–Stockbarger technique. They often have bluish color owing to the presence of colloidal Li. This color can be removed by post-growth annealing at lower temperatures (~550 °C) and lower thermal gradients. Major impurities in these crystals are Na (20–200 ppm), O (10–100 ppm), Mg (0.5–6 ppm), Fe (0.5-2 ppm) and Cu (0.5-2 ppm).

Bulk cold-pressed LiH parts can be easily machined using standard techniques and tools to micrometer precision. However, cast LiH is brittle and easily cracks during processing.

A more energy efficient route to form lithium hydride powder is by ball milling lithium metal under high hydrogen pressure. A problem with this method is the cold welding of lithium metal due to the high ductility. By adding small amounts of lithium hydride powder the cold welding can be avoided.

Reactions
In moist air the powder ignites spontaneously, forming a mixture of products including some nitrogenous compounds. The lump material reacts with humid air, forming a superficial coating, which is a viscous fluid. This inhibits further reaction, although the appearance of a film of "tarnish" is quite evident. Little or no nitride is formed on exposure to humid air. The lump material, contained in a metal dish, may be heated in air to slightly below 200 °C without igniting, although it ignites readily when touched by an open flame. The surface condition of LiH, presence of oxides on the metal dish, etc., have a considerable effect on the ignition temperature. Dry oxygen does not react with crystalline LiH unless heated strongly, when an almost explosive combustion occurs.

LiH is highly reactive towards water and other protic reagents:

LiH is less reactive with water than Li and thus is a much less powerful reducing agent for water, alcohols, and other media containing reducible solutes. This is true for all the binary saline hydrides.

LiH pellets slowly expand in moist air, forming LiOH; however, the expansion rate is below 10% within 24 hours in a pressure of 2 Torr of water vapor. If moist air contains carbon dioxide, then the product is lithium carbonate. LiH reacts with ammonia, slowly at room temperature, but the reaction accelerates significantly above 300 °C. LiH reacts slowly with higher alcohols and phenols, but vigorously with lower alcohols.

LiH reacts with sulfur dioxide:

though above 50 °C the product is lithium dithionite.

LiH reacts with acetylene to form lithium carbide and hydrogen. With anhydrous organic acids, phenols and acid anhydrides, LiH reacts slowly, producing hydrogen gas and the lithium salt of the acid. With water-containing acids, LiH reacts faster than with water. Many reactions of LiH with oxygen-containing species yield LiOH, which in turn irreversibly reacts with LiH at temperatures above 300 °C:

It is, therefore, used in the synthesis of other useful hydrides, e.g.,

Applications

Hydrogen storage and fuel
With a hydrogen content in proportion to its mass three times that of NaH, LiH has the highest hydrogen content of any hydride. LiH is periodically of interest for hydrogen storage, but applications have been thwarted by its stability to decomposition. Thus removal of  requires temperatures above the 700 °C used for its synthesis, such temperatures are expensive to create and maintain. The compound was once tested as a fuel component in a model rocket.

Precursor to complex metal hydrides
LiH is not usually a hydride-reducing agent, except in the synthesis of hydrides of certain metalloids. For example, silane is produced in the reaction of lithium hydride and silicon tetrachloride by the Sundermeyer process:

Lithium hydride is used in the production of a variety of reagents for organic synthesis, such as lithium aluminium hydride and lithium borohydride. Triethylborane reacts to give superhydride.

In nuclear chemistry and physics
Lithium hydride (LiH) is sometimes a desirable material for the shielding of nuclear reactors, with the isotope lithium-6 (Li-6), and it can be fabricated by casting.

Lithium deuteride
Lithium deuteride, in the form of lithium-7 deuteride ( or 7LiD), is a good moderator for nuclear reactors, because deuterium (2H or D) has a lower neutron absorption cross-section than ordinary hydrogen or protium (1H) does, and the cross-section for 7Li is also low, decreasing the absorption of neutrons in a reactor. 7Li is preferred for a moderator because it has a lower neutron capture cross-section, and it also forms less tritium (3H or T) under bombardment with neutrons.

The corresponding lithium-6 deuteride ( or 6LiD) is the primary fusion fuel in thermonuclear weapons. In hydrogen warheads of the Teller–Ulam design, a nuclear fission trigger explodes to heat and compress the lithium-6 deuteride, and to bombard the 6LiD with neutrons to produce tritium in an exothermic reaction:

The deuterium and tritium then fuse to produce helium, one neutron, and 17.59 MeV of free energy in the form of gamma rays, kinetic energy, etc. The helium is an inert byproduct.

Before the Castle Bravo nuclear weapons test in 1954, it was thought that only the less common isotope 6Li would breed tritium when struck with fast neutrons. The Castle Bravo test showed (accidentally) that the more plentiful 7Li also does so under extreme conditions, albeit by an endothermic reaction.

Safety
LiH reacts violently with water to give hydrogen gas and LiOH, which is caustic. Consequently, LiH dust can explode in humid air, or even in dry air due to static electricity. Because of the irritation, LiH is normally rejected rather than accumulated by the body.

Some lithium salts, which can be produced in LiH reactions, are toxic. LiH fire should not be extinguished using carbon dioxide, carbon tetrachloride, or aqueous fire extinguishers; it should be smothered by covering with a metal object or graphite or dolomite powder. Sand is less suitable, as it can explode when mixed with burning LiH, especially if not dry. LiH is normally transported in oil, using containers made of ceramic, certain plastics or steel, and is handled in an atmosphere of dry argon or helium. Nitrogen can be used, but not at elevated temperatures, as it reacts with lithium. LiH normally contains some metallic lithium, which corrodes steel or silica containers at elevated temperatures.

References

External links 

 University of Southampton, Mountbatten Centre for International Studies, Nuclear History Working Paper No5.
 CDC - NIOSH Pocket Guide to Chemical Hazards

Lithium compounds
Metal hydrides
Nuclear materials
Nuclear fusion fuels
Superbases
Rock salt crystal structure